Tashi Rabstan (born on 10 April 1963) is an Indian Judge. Presently, he is a Judge of Jammu & Kashmir and Ladakh High Court. He has also served as Acting Chief Justice of Jammu & Kashmir and Ladakh High Court.

Career
He was born on 10 April 1963 at village Skurbuchan, Leh Ladakh. He did his graduation and LL.B from University of Jammu. On 6 March 1990, he was enrolled in Bar Council of Jammu and Kashmir and started practicing in Jammu & Kashmir and Ladakh High Court and in various other High Courts. He has served as Standing Counsel for Ladakh Autonomous Hill Development Council, Leh from 1997 to 2005. He was appointed as Central government counsel for Jammu & Kashmir and Ladakh High Court in September 1998. He has also served as panel counsel for Union Public Service Commission from April 2008 to 31 December 2011. He was appointed as an Additional Judge of Jammu & Kashmir and Ladakh High Court on 8 March 2013 and made permanent on 16 May 2014. He has served as Acting Chief Justice of Jammu & Kashmir and Ladakh High Court from 8 December 2022 to 14 February 2023.

References 

 

Indian judges
1963 births
Living people